Rosa María Pérez (born 8 April 1977) is a Spanish former professional tennis player. She has also played on the Padel Pro Tour.

Pérez, a native of Alicante, achieved a career high singles ranking of 340 in the world, with her only WTA Tour main draw appearance coming as a qualifier at the 1995 Championships of Spain.

From 2000 to 2003, Pérez competed in varsity tennis for Texas Christian University.

ITF finals

Singles: 2 (1–1)

Doubles: 4 (1–3)

References

External links
 
 

1977 births
Living people
Spanish female tennis players
TCU Horned Frogs women's tennis players
Sportspeople from Alicante
Female tennis players playing padel
Tennis players from the Valencian Community